The 2012–2013 cyclo-cross season consists of three international series conducted in the bicycle racing discipline of cyclo-cross: 
World Cup
Superprestige
BPost Bank Trophy

The season began on 7 October with the Cyclo-cross Ruddervoorde, won by Sven Nys. It is scheduled to end on 24 February 2013. The season will also include the 2013 UCI Cyclo-cross World Championships on 2 February in Louisville, Kentucky, the first edition of that event to be held outside of Europe.

Race calendar

National Championships

See also
2013 UCI Cyclo-cross World Championships
2011–2012 cyclo-cross season
Glossary of cycling
History of cycling
Outline of cycling

References

2012 in cyclo-cross
2013 in cyclo-cross
Cyclo-cross by year